The Ellsworth Downtown Historic District is a historic district which was listed on the National Register of Historic Places in 2007.

The district is a  area generally including blocks between N. Main & 3rd Sts. from Lincoln to Kansas Avenues, plus the west side of Kansas Ave.  It included 52 contributing buildings.

Its NRHP nomination asserted: "The buildings in downtown Ellsworth interpret the history of the community's permanent commercial development. The Ellsworth Downtown Historic District is being nominated to the National Register of Historic Places under Criterion A for its association with the growth and development of Ellsworth and Criterion C for its architectural significance."

It includes the Insurance Building, which was separately listed on the National Register in 2006.

References

External links

Historic districts on the National Register of Historic Places in Kansas
Victorian architecture in Kansas
Ellsworth County, Kansas